Don Pastor is a Filipino-American racing driver. He was the first Filipino-American to participate in the NASCAR Whelen Euroseries race circuit. He was named Philippine Driver of the Year in 2010 and has won the 2012 Global Time Attack race held in Buttonwillow, California. Don Pastor was also dubbed as the "Don of Racing".

References

Started in Motorsports in 2002 to present, currently racing with the Asian V8 Championship.

• 2013 Filipino-American Euro-Whelen NASCAR Series

• 2013 Global time attack Class Champion

• 2012 Redline Time Attack Class Champion

• 2011 Launched Race School in U.S.A.

• 2003 First Filipino awarded scholar in Europe, Team Driver for Formula BMWW Asia F1 JUNIOR PROGRAM

• 2004 ASIAN FORMULA 3 - Winner in China Golden Port Race way under TEAM TOM'S TOYOTA

• 2009 Philippine Touring Car Champion under Spec HONDA

• 2009 Awarded National Driver of the Year

• 2009 National Endurance Cup Champion

• KT 100CC JUNIOR GO KART Winner Exhibition Race Carmona Philippines

Living people
1985 births
Sportspeople from Los Angeles County, California
Racing drivers from California
NASCAR drivers
American sportspeople of Filipino descent
People from East Los Angeles, California
Racing drivers from Los Angeles